The 1999 Dreamland Egypt Classic singles was the singles event of the only edition of the Dreamland Egypt Classic; a WTA Tier III tournament and then the most prestigious women's tennis tournament held in Africa. Arantxa Sánchez Vicario won it, defeating Irina Spîrlea, 6–1, 6–0, in the final.

Seeds
The top two seeds received a bye to the second round.

Draw

Finals

Top half

Bottom half

Qualifying

Seeds

Qualifiers

Lucky losers
  Eva Bes Ostariz

Qualifying draw

First qualifier

Second qualifier

Third qualifier

Fourth qualifier

External links
 1999 Dreamland Egypt Classic Draw

Dreamland Egypt Classic
Dreamland Egypt Classic